Helio Koa'eloa (ca. 1815–1846), was a Hawaiian Catholic lay missionary called as the "Apostle of Maui" for converting about 4,000 natives to the Catholic faith. Landmarks and memorials were dedicated to him at Maui. A cross (called Hâna cross) was erected in Wailua valley in his memory in 1931.

Biography 
Koa'eloa was born in 1815 on Wailua Valley, Maui, Hawaii. He was living in Hāna when he heard about the arrival of a new religion, Catholicism. He paddled a canoe to Honolulu to be personally instructed in the faith and to join the church. Then he returned to Maui and instructed over 4,000 people for the Catholic Mission. His boundless enthusiasm for the promotion of the Catholic faith earned him the title "Apostle of Maui". Before the Catholic Mission was properly established in Maui, Koa'eloa died in 1848 and was buried in Wailua, the valley of his birth.

References

1815 births
1846 deaths
People from Maui
Native Hawaiian people
Roman Catholic missionaries in Hawaii
Roman Catholic Diocese of Honolulu
19th-century venerated Christians
American Servants of God
Hawaiian Kingdom Roman Catholics
Catholics from Hawaii